Linda Stahl (born 2 October 1985) is a retired German track and field athlete who competed in the javelin throw.

Career

She won gold at the 2010 European Athletics Championships in Barcelona, Spain, throwing a then personal best throw of 66.81 metres.

Stahl finished 3rd at the Europeans in 2012 with a result of 63.69 m. She also took the bronze medal at the Olympics in London with a season's best throw of 64.91 m.

In 2013, she was 4th at the World Championships in Moscow with a result of 64.78 m.

In 2014, she took the bronze at the Europeans in Zürich after leading the competition till the 5th round, and also improved her personal best to 67.32 m.

She grew up in Blomberg, and studies Medicine at the University of Cologne. She represented the sports club TSV Bayer 04 Leverkusen, having changed club in 2003 from LG Lippe-Süd, and trained with Steffi Nerius under coach Helge Zöllkau.

Achievements

References

External links
 

1985 births
Living people
People from Höxter (district)
Sportspeople from Detmold (region)
University of Münster alumni
German female javelin throwers
Athletes (track and field) at the 2012 Summer Olympics
Athletes (track and field) at the 2016 Summer Olympics
Olympic athletes of Germany
Olympic bronze medalists for Germany
European Athletics Championships medalists
Medalists at the 2012 Summer Olympics
World Athletics Championships athletes for Germany
Olympic bronze medalists in athletics (track and field)